Pseudohemiculter dispar is a species of freshwater ray-finned fish from the family Cyprinidae, the carps and minnows from south east Asia. It occurs in the Mekong and Nam Ma basins in Laos, central and northern Vietnam, and southern China.

References

Fish of Thailand
Cyprinid fish of Asia
Pseudohemiculter
Fish described in 1881
Taxa named by Wilhelm Peters